Alkylated-DNA glycohydrolase (releasing methyladenine and methylguanine) may refer to:

 DNA-3-methyladenine glycosylase I, an enzyme
 DNA-3-methyladenine glycosylase II, an enzyme